"Reapers" is a song by English rock band Muse. It was released as the second promotional single from the band's seventh studio album Drones, and was given a 7" single release, as part of Record Store Day 2016, on 16 April 2016 as the fifth and final single from Drones. It peaked at number 75 on the French Singles Chart, 71 on the Swiss Hitparade singles chart, 37 on Billboards Hot Rock Songs, and became Muse's highest-charting single at the time on Billboards Mainstream Rock Songs at number 2; it has since been surpassed on the latter chart by "Won't Stand Down," which reached number 1 in May 2022.

Release 
"Reapers" was released a promotional single for Drones on 29 May 2015. It was released as a Record Store Day 7" picture disc vinyl on 16 April 2016. The A-side consists of the song's album version, while the B-side consists of a live performance at the Gloria Theater in Köln, Germany. The release also includes a fold-your-own paper plane (marketed as a "paper drone").

Music video
A lyric video for the song was uploaded to the band's official YouTube channel on 29 May 2015. A full video followed. Rolling Stone called it "brutal and chilling ... fittingly blunt, depicting a man caught in the crosshairs of a drone and running for his life while a woman with red lipstick waits to pull the trigger."

Critical reception
In an album review for The Observer, Kitty Empire commented that the pacy song "exposes the overlap between the unfeeling destruction of drone warfare and the unfeeling destruction wrought by people tearing each other apart," referring to Muse frontman Matt Bellamy's break-up from fiancée Kate Hudson. She also compared Bellamy to Yngwie Malmsteen, noting that the song contains "meaty riffs."

Track listing

Digital download

7" vinyl

Personnel
Personnel adapted from single liner notes.

Tom Bailey – assistant engineer
Matt Bellamy – composing
Mario Borgatta – mix assistant
Marc Carolan – engineering, mixing 
Tommasa Colliva – engineering, additional production
Martin Cooke – assistant mixer
Rich Costey – additional production, mixing
Jacopo Dorici – assistant engineer

Nick Fourier – assistant mixer
Robert John "Mutt" Lange – production
Eric Mosher – assistant engineer
Muse – production
John Prestage – assistant engineer
Olle Romo – additional programming
Giuseppe Salvadori – assistant engineer
Giovanni Versari – mastering

Charts

References

2016 singles
2015 songs
Muse (band) songs
Song recordings produced by Robert John "Mutt" Lange
Songs written by Matt Bellamy
Warner Records singles
British hard rock songs
Glam metal songs